Gladiolus illyricus, the wild gladiolus, is a tall gladiolus plant that grows up to  tall found in western and southern Europe, particularly around the Mediterranean region.

In Britain a small population is known in the New Forest region; Williamson suggests this population may be introduced. It became a protected species in the UK in 1975 under the Conservation of Wild Creatures and Wild Plants Act.

References

External links
 iNaturalist

illyricus
Flora of Portugal
Flora of Spain
Plants described in 1837